Kubitschek Plaza is a luxurious 5-star hotel located in Brasília, Brazil. It is named after President Juscelino Kubitschek, founder of Brasília. Its part of the Plaza Brasília Hotels along with Manhattan Plaza, Brasília Palace and St. Paul Plaza. The hotel comprises 389 suites and apartments distributed on 17 floors, 2 restaurants, 3 bars, a swimming pool, sauna and fitness center, a business center and facilities for meetings and conventions.

External links
 Plaza Brasília Hotels – Kubitschek Plaza Official Site

Buildings and structures in Brasília
Hotels in Brazil
Companies based in Brasília
Hotels established in 1990
Hotel buildings completed in 1990